The 1975 Cal State Los Angeles Diablos football team represented California State University, Los Angeles as a member of the California Collegiate Athletic Association (CCAA) during the 1975 NCAA Division II football season. Led by Jim Williams in his fifth and final season as head coach, the Diablos compiled an overall record of 1–7–1 with a mark of 0–4 in conference play, placing last out of fives teams in the CCAA. The team was outscored 290 to 168 for the season. The Diablos played home games at the Campus Stadium in Los Angeles.

Schedule

References

Cal State Los Angeles
Cal State Los Angeles Diablos football seasons
Cal State Los Angeles Diablos football